The University of Education, Winneba (UEW) is a university in Winneba, Central Region of Ghana. It was established in 1992 by a government ordinance (PNDC Law 322) and with a relationship with the University of Cape Coast. Its main aim is to train teachers for the education system of Ghana. The University of Education, Winneba is charged with the responsibility of teacher education and producing professional educators to spearhead a new national vision of education aimed at redirecting Ghana's efforts along the path of rapid economic and social development. The University of Education, Winneba is expected to play a leading role in Ghana's drive to produce scholars whose knowledge would be fully responsive to the realities and exigencies of contemporary Ghana.

Organisation

The university has twenty-nine academic departments and centers, seven faculties. It also has 18 distance education regional study centers throughout Ghana.

In addition to three campuses in Winneba where its administrative office is located, the university has one extra campuse in addition to over 20 study centers:
 The College of Languages Education – Ajumako Campus

College of Languages Education

The Ajumako Campus currently hosts the students of the Department of Akan-Nzema Education, Ewe Education, Ga–Dangme Education of The Faculty of Languages Education.

Gradually the Faculty of Languages Education will move from the Winneba Campus to the Ajumako Campus and will eventually become the College of Languages Education.

Faculty of Languages Education
 Department of Akan-Nzema Education
 Department of Applied Linguistics
 Department of English Education
 Department of French Education
 Department of Gur - Gonja Education
 Department of Ewe Education

The Winneba Campus – Main Campus

The Winneba Campus is the main campus of the university and is spread over three sites (North, Central and South) within the Effutu Municipality. The central administration of the university is located at the South Campus. The Winneba Campus hosts the following faculties, schools, institute, centers and offices:

Faculty of Social Sciences Education
 Department of Health, Physical Education, Recreation and Sports Education
 Department of Home Economics
 Departments of Mathematics Education
 Department of Biology Education
 Department of Social Science Education
 Department of Social Studies Education
 Department of Business Administration
 Department of Health Administration and Education

Institutes and schools

School of Creative Arts
 Department of Art Education
 Department of Graphic Design
 Department of Music School
 Department of Theatre Arts

Institute for Educational Development and Extension
 Center for Continuing Education
 Center for Distance Education
 Center for Teacher Development and Action Research

Institutes for Educational Research and Innovation Studies (IERIS)
 National Center for Research into Basic Education (NCRIBE)
 Center for Educational Policy Studies (CEPS)
 Center for School and Community Science and Technology Studies (SACOST)

Campuses 

It is a multi-campus, multi-site university. It has six campuses, three at Winneba and one at Ajumako in the Central Region of Ghana, and the other two at Kumasi and Mampong respectively, both in the Ashanti Region.

As a multi-campus, multi-site university with campuses and learning centres in other parts of the country, UEW has six Faculties, one institute and two centres of the university provide programmes in the areas of Science and Mathematics Education, Technology and Business Education, Agriculture Education, Home Economics Education, Cultural Studies, Creative Arts Education, Guidance and Counselling and Educational Administration and Leadership.

Memorandum of Understanding 
In May 2021, the institution signed an MoU with an NGO called Transforming Teaching, Education and Learning to improve education. The MoU was signed at the Council Chamber of the North Campus of the institution. The project was funded by the MasterCard Foundation.

References

External links
 Official website
 Ghana Students Uew Forum

University of Education, Winneba
Educational institutions established in 1992
1992 establishments in Ghana
Central Region (Ghana)